Michigan's 4th congressional district is a United States congressional district located in the state of Michigan. The current 4th district contains much of Michigan's old 2nd district, and includes all of Allegan and Van Buren counties, as well as portions of Ottawa, Kalamazoo, Calhoun, and Berrien counties. In 2022, the district was redrawn to start in St. Joseph Township and extend north to Port Sheldon Township.  The 4th is currently represented by Republican Bill Huizenga, who previously represented the old 2nd district.

Cities

Recent results in statewide elections

History
Michigan's 4th congressional district was first formed in 1852.  At this time It covered everywhere from Macomb County to the western end of the Upper Peninsula.  Ingham County was not in the district, and then the boundary turned northward after Eaton County only going west again  Midland County was reached.  It went west again along Midland and subsequent counties southern lines and then headed north again on the east side of Muskegon County, with Manistee being its southern county that bordered Lake Michigan.

In 1863 it gained the areas around Grand Rapids and Muskegon but lost everything east of Ionia County and most of the Upper Peninsula.  In 1872 it was redrawn to cover Berrien, Cass, Kalamazoo, Van Buren and St. Joseph Counties.  In 1892 these boundaries were altered by the addition of Allegan and Barry Counties but the subtraction of Kalamazoo County.  This remained the district boundaries for the next 72 years.

In 1964 the 4th district was redrawn.  Barry County was subtracted from the district while Branch and Hillsdale Counties were added.  In 1972 the district boundaries were altered by adding small sections of Calhoun County and subtracting small portions of Hillsdale and St. Joseph Counties.

The 1982 redistricting removed from the district all of Hillsdale County and the portion of Calhoun County that was in the district.  Quincy and Butler Townships in Branch County were also removed.  In Kalamazoo County Schoolcraft Township and most of Portage were added to the district.  The southern and western portions of Allegan County and most of western Ottawa County including Holland, Michigan were also in the district.

In the renumbering of 1992 this district essentially became the 6th, while the old 10th became the new 4th.

The old 10th and 1990s 4th
The old 10th included most of Grand Traverse and all of Kalkaska County which were lost to the new 1st (old 11th) in the 1992 redistricting.  It also included Wexford County that was moved to the new 2nd (old 9th) in the 1992 redistricting.  The only other areas lost were small parts of Antrim and Iosco Counties and a portion of Shiawasee County consisting of Durand and Vernon Township.

The new 4th gained Montcalm county from the old 9th district.  It gained the Clinton and most of the Shiawasee portions of the old 6th district and the northern half of Oscoda County.  It also gained a portion of south-west Saginaw County and the portion of Midland County that had not been in the old 10th.

In 2002 Leelaunau County and a small section of north-west Grand Traverse County were the only areas gerrymandered from the 1st and other districts into the 4th that had not been in the old 10th.

List of members representing the district

Recent election results

2012

2014

2016

2018

2020

2022

See also
Michigan's congressional districts
List of United States congressional districts

Notes

References 
 Govtrack.us for the 4th District - Lists current Senators and representative, and map showing district outline
 The Political graveyard: U.S. Representatives from Michigan, 1807-2003
U.S. Representatives 1837-2003, Michigan Manual 2003-2004

 Congressional Biographical Directory of the United States 1774–present

04
Central Michigan
Northern Michigan
Constituencies established in 1853
1853 establishments in Michigan